New Agreement was a Catalan electoral alliance formed by the Socialists' Party of Catalonia (PSC) and Republican Left of Catalonia (ERC) to contest the 1979 Spanish Senate election. ERC and the PSC's predecessors, the Socialist Party of Catalonia–Congress (PSC–C) and the Catalan Socialist Federation (FSC), had formed the Agreement of the Catalans in the preceding election together with the Unified Socialist Party of Catalonia (PSUC) and Catalan State (EC), but the alliance broke up into two in early 1979, the other part coalescing around the For the Agreement alliance.

Composition

Electoral performance

Senate

Notes

References

1979 establishments in Catalonia
1982 disestablishments in Spain
Defunct political party alliances in Spain
Defunct political parties in Catalonia
Political parties established in 1979
Political parties disestablished in 1982